Throughout their existence East Germany and the Soviet Union maintained close diplomatic relations. The Soviet Union was the chief economic and political sponsor of East Germany.

History
In 1964, Anastas Mikoyan's 10–12 March trip to East Berlin, ostensibly to celebrate the 70th birthday of inactive and ailing Premier Otto Grotewohl, was particularly curious in light of the fact- that no other bloc dignitaries of Mikoyan's rank attended.  Mikoyan's appearance seemed to represent a Soviet effort to assuage East German fears on certain economic and military points of disagreement.

In 1963 the 13 June Soviet-GDR joint communique recorded Ulbricht's praise for Khrushchev's policy of "mutual example" in a manner that could be read as giving approval in principal to further Soviet efforts in that vein, including a reduction in the Soviet forces in East Germany.

Brezhnev era
On the day Khrushchev left for his vacation, East German Premier Willi Stoph made a sudden visit to Moscow and commenced an intensive three-day series of talks with Kosygin and other high-level Kremlin leaders. The timing of Stoph's visit, ostensibly for the purpose of opening an exhibit devoted to the 15th anniversary of the GDR.

Then in rapid succession, Suslov and Brezhnev came forward with strong statements reassuring the East German leaders about Soviet intentions toward East Germany. Suslov made a flat no-sell-out pledge in Moscow on the same day (5 October) that Brezhnev was welcomed in East Berlin by Ulbricht, who had refused to greet Khrushchev's son-in law two months earlier. Ulbricht on 6 October responded with a rather defiant lecture on the limits of Soviet interference in GDR sovereignty. And at the same podium Brezhnev promised that there would be no "behind-the-back" deals detrimental to GDR interests.

Mikhail Suslov, in his 5 October speech at a Kremlin meeting devoted to the GDR anniversary went out of his way to deny the possibility of a Bonn-Moscow deal at the expense of the GDR's "sovereignty". Suslov voiced the flat "guarantee" that "even if all the gold in the world were offered, the relations between Moscow and East Berlin would still not be for sale.

The initial GDR reaction to Khrushchev's ouster and its treatment of the sell-out question was ambivalent. On the one hand, there was evidence to suggest that Khruschev's removal brought quick relief to the leaders in East Berlin about the fate of East Germany's future. The GDR's first official reaction to the Kremlin coup, which was registered in the 17 October communique of the Central Committee of the Socialist Unity Party of Germany—the first Eastern European party statement on the Khrushchev ouster—was that the friendship treaty of June 1964 will be carried out "honorably" implying, perhaps, that there was some question among the East German leaders as to whether it would have been honorably implemented prior to Khrushchev's ouster.

The new leadership may have felt that other more pressing domestic and foreign matters demanded their initial concentration and that any major diplomatic action such as the Bonn visit—on the German question should be postponed. Concentration on other foreign and domestic matters may also explain, in part, Moscow's dropping of any element of urgency in the new Soviet peace treaty line .
East German displeasure over the Soviet shelving of the peace treaty-West Berlin Issues may have accounted, in part, for the surprisingly low-key treatment given by the GDR to Kosygin's 27 February-2 March 1965 visit to East Germany to take in the annual Leipzig trade fair.

On October 5, 1979, while Brezhnev was visiting East Germany in the 30th anniversary of the foundation of the East German state, the two countries signed a ten-year agreement of mutual support under which East Germany would provide ships, machinery and chemical equipment to the Soviet Union and the Soviet Union would provide fuel and nuclear equipment to East Germany.

References

 
Soviet Union
Bilateral relations of the Soviet Union
Germany–Soviet Union relations